Trusten Polk (1811–1876) was a U.S. Senator from Missouri from 1857 to 1862. Senator Polk may also refer to:

Charles Polk Jr. (1788–1857), Delaware State Senate
John A. Polk (born 1949), Mississippi State Senate
Lucius E. Polk (1833–1892), Tennessee State Senate
Lucius Junius Polk (1802–1870), Tennessee State Senate
VanLeer Polk (1858–1907), Tennessee State Senate